Kenneth Baird may refer to:

Kenneth M. Baird (born 1923), Canadian physicist, metrologist and inventor
Ken Baird (1951–2016), ice hockey player